Joe Miller (born 18 November 1984), is a British golfer who competes as a professional long drive athlete. He has won the World Long Drive Championship on two occasions, in 2010 and 2016.

Personal life 
Miller was brought up in Barnet, London. Miller plays at The Shire London golf club and also works as a part-time gym trainer.

Long drive career 
Miller won the RE/MAX World Long Drive Championship in 2010 with a 414-yard drive. In doing so, he became the second European to win the title, and collected the $150,000 first prize. He recaptured the title in 2016; he produced a 423-yard drive in the final to collect the $125,000 first prize.

References

External links 
 

1984 births
Living people
Golfers from London
English male golfers
Long drive golfers